Sir Archie Reuben Louis Michaelis (19 December 1889 – 22 April 1975) was an Australian politician. He was a member of the Victorian Legislative Assembly from 1932 to 1952, representing the electorate of St Kilda for the United Australia Party and its successor. the Liberal Party.

Early life
Michaelis was born in St Kilda into a wealthy Jewish family who owned the successful leather tannery Michaelis, Hallenstein & Co. The family home was the historic mansion Linden on Acland Street, now a contemporary arts centre. He attended Wesley College and Cumloden School in St Kilda, until 1903 when his family took him to England to be educated at Harrow School.

In 1908, Michaelis returned to Melbourne, where he began working for the family business, and in 1912 he returned to England to work in the company's London office. He was in England when World War I broke out, and he immediately enlisted in the British Army, serving with the Honourable Artillery Company in the Middle East and in 1916 was commissioned in the Royal Field Artillery in which he served in Ireland and Greece.

Political career
At the 1932 Victorian election, Michaelis was elected to the Victorian Legislative Assembly representing the seat of St Kilda for the United Australia Party (later to become the Liberal Party). He was made a minister without portfolio in Ian MacFarlan's "stop-gap" ministry from October to November 1945.

In June 1950, Michaelis was elected Speaker of the Victorian Legislative Assembly. He was knighted in the 1952 New Year Honours. In October 1952, he was one of six members of the Victorian parliament who made affidavits to Liberal and Country Party leader Les Norman that they had been offered financial and political incentives by representatives of Thomas Hollway, a disaffected  MP and former Premier of Victoria, who needed parliamentary support for a planned motion of no-confidence against the governing Country Party led by John McDonald. Michaelis stated that he had been approached by a man named Raymond Ellinson, who offered him the position of Agent-General, another term as Speaker, and immunity from opposition in the next election. A Royal Commission was established to investigate the charges against Hollway, but it was postponed indefinitely on a legal technicality and never reconvened. In the subsequent state election in December 1952, Michaelis was defeated by the Labor Party candidate John Bourke, and retired from politics.

References

1889 births
1975 deaths
Members of the Victorian Legislative Assembly
Speakers of the Victorian Legislative Assembly
Liberal Party of Australia members of the Parliament of Victoria
United Australia Party members of the Parliament of Victoria
Australian Knights Bachelor
Australian politicians awarded knighthoods
People educated at Harrow School
British Army personnel of World War I
Honourable Artillery Company soldiers
Royal Field Artillery officers
Jewish Australian politicians
20th-century Australian politicians
People from St Kilda, Victoria
Australian expatriates in England
Military personnel from Melbourne
Politicians from Melbourne